Suzanne may refer to:

People
 Suzanne (given name), a feminine given name (including a list of people with the name)
 S. U. Zanne, pen name of August Vandekerkhove (1838–1923), Belgian writer and inventor
 Suzanne, pen name of Renée Méndez Capote (1901–1989), Cuban writer
 Suzanne (television personality) (born 1986), Japanese variety tarento, actress, and singer
 Suzanne Lynch (born 1951), New Zealand singer who performed as "Suzanne"

Places
 Suzanne, Ardennes, France, a commune
 Suzanne, Somme, France, a commune

Films
 Suzanne (1932 film), a French film 
 Suzanne (1980 film), a Canadian film 
 Suzanne (2013 film), a French film
 Suzanne, Suzanne, a 1982 documentary film

Music
"Suzanne" (Leonard Cohen song), a 1966 poem and 1967 song, covered by numerous artists
 "Suzanne" (Creeper song), a 2016 song by English band Creeper
 "Suzanne" (VOF de Kunst song), 1983
 "Suzanne" (Journey song), a song from Raised on Radio by Journey
 "Suzanne", a song from 12 Songs by Randy Newman
 "Suzanne", a song from Blue Room by Unwritten Law
 "Suzanne", a song on the self-titled album Lisa Stansfield

Computer graphics
 Suzanne (3D model), a primitive of a chimpanzee for the 3D-modeling application "Blender"

Ships
 , a United States Navy patrol vessel in commission from 1917 to 1918

See also
 
 Susanne (disambiguation)
 Suzie Q (disambiguation)
 Susan
 Suzette